The Great Molasses Flood, also known as the Boston Molasses Disaster, was a disaster that occurred on January 15, 1919, in the North End neighborhood of Boston, Massachusetts.

The event entered local folklore and residents claimed for decades afterwards that the area still smelled of molasses on hot summer days.

Flood 

Molasses can be fermented to produce ethanol, the active ingredient in alcoholic beverages and a key component in munitions. The disaster occurred at the Purity Distilling Company facility at 529Commercial Street near Keany Square. A considerable amount of molasses had been stored there by the company, which used the harborside Commercial Street tank to offload molasses from ships and store it for later transfer by pipeline to the Purity ethanol plant situated between Willow Street and Evereteze Way in Cambridge, Massachusetts.

On January 15, 1919, temperatures in Boston had risen above , climbing rapidly from the frigid temperatures of the preceding days, and the previous day, a ship had delivered a fresh load of molasses, which had been warmed to reduce its viscosity for transfer. Possibly due to the thermal expansion of the older, colder molasses already inside the tank, the tank burst open and collapsed at approximately 12:30p.m. Witnesses reported that they felt the ground shake and heard a roar as it collapsed, a long rumble similar to the passing of an elevated train; others reported a tremendous crashing, a deep growling, "a thunderclap-like ", and a sound like a machine gun as the rivets shot out of the tank.

The wave was of sufficient force to drive steel panels of the burst tank against the girders of the adjacent Boston Elevated Railway's Atlantic Avenue structure and tip a streetcar momentarily off the El's tracks. Stephen Puleo describes how nearby buildings were swept off their foundations and crushed. Puleo quotes a Boston Post report:

The Boston Globe reported that people "were picked up by a rush of air and hurled many feet". Others had debris hurled at them from the rush of sweet-smelling air. A truck was picked up and hurled into Boston Harbor. After the initial wave, the molasses became viscous, exacerbated by the cold temperatures, trapping those caught in the wave and making it even more difficult to rescue them. About 150 people were injured, and 21 people and several horses were killed. Some were crushed and drowned by the molasses or by the debris that it carried within. The wounded included people, horses, and dogs; coughing fits became one of the most common ailments after the initial blast. Edwards Park wrote of one child's experience in a 1983 article for Smithsonian:

Aftermath 

The cadets ran several blocks toward the accident and entered into the knee-deep flood of molasses to pull out the survivors, while others worked to keep curious onlookers from getting in the way of the rescuers. The Boston Police, Red Cross, Army, and Navy personnel soon arrived. Some nurses from the Red Cross dived into the molasses, while others tended to the injured, keeping them warm and feeding the exhausted workers. Many of these people worked through the night, and the injured were so numerous that doctors and surgeons set up a makeshift hospital in a nearby building. Rescuers found it difficult to make their way through the syrup to help the victims, and four days elapsed before they stopped searching; many of the dead were so glazed over in molasses that they were hard to recognize. Other victims were swept into Boston Harbor and were found three to four months after the disaster.

In the wake of the accident, 119 residents brought a class-action lawsuit against the United States Industrial Alcohol Company (USIA), which had bought Purity Distilling in 1917. It was one of the first class-action suits in Massachusetts and is considered a milestone in paving the way for modern corporate regulation. Relatives of those killed reportedly received around $7,000 per victim (equivalent to $ in ).

Cleanup 
Cleanup crews used salt water from a fireboat to wash away the molasses and sand to absorb it, and the harbor was brown with molasses until summer. The cleanup in the immediate area took weeks, with several hundred people contributing to the effort, and it took longer to clean the rest of Greater Boston and its suburbs. Rescue workers, cleanup crews, and sight-seers had tracked molasses through the streets and spread it to subway platforms, to the seats inside trains and streetcars, to pay telephone handsets, into homes, and to countless other places. It was reported that "Everything that a Bostonian touched was sticky."

Fatalities

Causes 

Several factors might have contributed to the disaster. The first factor is that the tank may have leaked from the very first day that it was filled in 1915. The tank was also constructed poorly and tested insufficiently, and carbon dioxide production might have raised the internal pressure due to fermentation in the tank. The failure occurred from a manhole cover near the base of the tank, and a fatigue crack there possibly grew to the point of criticality.

The tank had been filled to capacity only eight times since it was built a few years previously, putting the walls under an intermittent, cyclical load. Several authors say that the Purity Distilling Company was trying to out-race prohibition, as the 18th amendment was ratified the next day (January 16, 1919) and took effect one year later. An inquiry after the disaster revealed that Arthur Jell, USIA's treasurer, neglected basic safety tests while overseeing construction of the tank, such as filling it with water insufficient to check for leaks, and ignored warning signs such as groaning noises each time the tank was filled. He had no architectural or engineering experience. When filled with molasses, the tank leaked so badly that it was painted brown to hide the leakage. Local residents collected leaked molasses for their homes. A 2014 investigation applied modern engineering analysis and found that the steel was half as thick as it should have been for a tank of its size even with the lower standards they had at the time. Another issue was that the steel lacked manganese and was made more brittle as a result. The tank's rivets were also apparently flawed, and cracks first formed at the rivet holes.

In 2016, a team of scientists and students at Harvard University conducted extensive studies of the disaster, gathering data from many sources, including 1919 newspaper articles, old maps, and weather reports. The student researchers also studied the behavior of cold corn syrup flooding a scale model of the affected neighborhood. The researchers concluded that the reports of the high speed of the flood were credible.

Two days before the disaster, warmer molasses had been added to the tank, reducing the viscosity of the fluid. When the tank collapsed, the fluid cooled quickly as it spread, until it reached Boston's winter evening temperatures and the viscosity increased dramatically. The Harvard study concluded that the molasses cooled and thickened quickly as it rushed through the streets, hampering efforts to free victims before they suffocated.

Area today 

United States Industrial Alcohol did not rebuild the tank. The property formerly occupied by the molasses tank and the North End Paving Company became a yard for the Boston Elevated Railway (predecessor to the Massachusetts Bay Transportation Authority). It is now the site of a city-owned recreational complex, officially named Langone Park, featuring a Little League Baseball field, a playground, and bocce courts. Immediately to the east is the larger Puopolo Park, with additional recreational facilities.

A small plaque at the entrance to Puopolo Park, placed by the Bostonian Society, commemorates the disaster. The plaque, titled "Boston Molasses Flood", reads:

The accident has since become a staple of local culture, not only for the damage the flood brought, but also for the sweet smell that filled the North End for decades after the disaster. According to journalist Edwards Park, "The smell of molasses remained for decades a distinctive, unmistakable atmosphere of Boston."

On January 15, 2019, for the 100th anniversary of the event, a ceremony was held in remembrance. Ground-penetrating radar was used to identify the exact location of the tank from 1919. Attendees of the ceremony stood in a circle marking the edge of the tank. The 21 names of those who died in, or as a result of, the flood were read aloud.

Cultural influences 
Many laws and regulations governing construction were changed as a direct result of the disaster, including requirements for oversight by a licensed architect and civil engineer.

One of the DUKW amphibious tourist vehicles operated by Boston Duck Tours has been named 'Molly Molasses' in remembrance of the event, per the firm's practice of naming their DUKWs after famous Boston locations, events, and other bits of local culture.

The Great Molasses Flood was also the theme of the 2019 MIT Mystery Hunt.

A song called "The Great Molasses Disaster" appears on the album The Dukes of Alhazred by the rock band The Darkest of the Hillside Thickets.

The song "Molasses" appeared on the 1985 album We the People by the Maine-based group Schooner Fare.

A book called I Survived the Great Molasses Flood, 1919 was written by the author Lauren Tarshis as part of the I Survived children's historical fiction book series.

The song "Sweet Bod" from the album Spirit Phone (2016) by Lemon Demon was described on the album's commentary track to have originally combined the legend of the mellified man with the true events of the molasses flood, but the lyrics were rewritten so as not to be insensitive to the victims of the disaster.

The song "All Hands" from the album Palimpsest (2020) by Protest The Hero references the flood from the perspective of one of the victims.

Comedy Central's Drunk History included a retelling of the story.

See also 
 List of non-water floods
 Honolulu molasses spill

Notes

References

Further reading

External links 

 Boston Public Library. Photos related to the event on Flickr. Many phrases are direct quotes.
 The Great Boston Molasses Flood of 1919, four-minute audio story at The American Storyteller Radio Journal
 Interview with Stephen Puleo, author of the book listed in "Further reading"
 Molasses Flood of 1919
 "Scenes in the Molasses-Flooded Streets of Boston", from the Washington Times, January 18, 1919
 100 years ago, Boston’s North End was hit by a deadly wave of molasses (photos)
 The Great Molasses Flood of 1919 was Boston’s strangest disaster (story with more photos)

1910s in Boston
1919 disasters in the United States
1919 in Massachusetts
1919 industrial disasters
Cultural history of Boston
Disasters in Boston
Engineering failures
Environmental disasters in the United States
Floods in the United States
Food processing disasters
Industrial accidents and incidents in the United States
January 1919 events
Molasses
North End, Boston